Yekaterina Gennadiyevna Volkova (born 16 February 1978 in Zheleznogorsk Kursk Oblast) is a Russian long-distance runner, who specializes in the 3000 metres steeplechase.

In her major international debut Volkova won the silver medal at the 2005 World Championships. Her time of 9:20.49 was a personal best.

In 2007, she won the gold medal at the 2007 World Championships in a world leading, championship record and personal best time of 9:06.57 minutes.

Doping scandal
In May 2016, it was reported that Volkova was one of 14 Russian athletes, and nine medalists, implicated in doping following the retesting of urine from the 2008 Olympic Games. Volkova was named as having failed the retest, which was undertaken following the Russian doping scandal of 2015 and 2016. If confirmed, under IOC and IAAF rules, she stands to lose her Olympic medal, and all results, medals and records from the date of the original test to May 2016.

In October 2016, the IOC stripped Volkova of her bronze medal from the 2008 Beijing Olympics after her doping sample were retested and failed.

Personal bests
1500 metres - 4:09.03 min (2005)
3000 metres - 8:54.64 min (2005)
3000 metres steeplechase - 9:06.57 min (2007)
5000 metres - 15:00.02 min (2007)

See also
List of doping cases in athletics
List of Olympic medalists in athletics (women)
List of 2008 Summer Olympics medal winners
List of stripped Olympic medals
Steeplechase at the Olympics
Doping in Russia
List of World Athletics Championships medalists (women)
List of 5000 metres national champions (women)

References

External links
 
 
 

1978 births
Living people
Sportspeople from Kursk Oblast
Russian female long-distance runners
Russian female steeplechase runners
Olympic female steeplechase runners
Olympic athletes of Russia
Athletes (track and field) at the 2008 Summer Olympics
Goodwill Games medalists in athletics
Competitors at the 2001 Goodwill Games
World Athletics Championships athletes for Russia
World Athletics Championships medalists
World Athletics Championships winners
Russian Athletics Championships winners
Doping cases in athletics
Russian sportspeople in doping cases